Mick Grant (born 10 July 1944) is an English former professional motorcycle road racer and TT rider. A works-supported rider for Norton, Kawasaki, Honda and Suzuki, he is a seven-time winner of the Isle of Man TT motorcycle race on various makes, including 'Slippery Sam', a three-cylinder Triumph Trident. The son of a coal miner, the soft-spoken, down-to-earth Yorkshireman from Wakefield, was a sharp contrast to the brash, playboy image presented by Londoner Barry Sheene during the 1970s.

Race career
Grant began his racing career as a privateer, entering his first Manx Grand Prix in 1969 on a Velocette 500 cc, and his first TT in the following year, again using the Velocette and placing 18th in the Junior (350 cc) class on a Lee-sponsored Yamaha TD2.

Later supported by businesses including Clive Padgett, heading Padgetts of Batley, on TD2 250 cc and TR2 350 cc Yamahas, and Brian Davidson of John Davidson Group on TZ Yamahas, he was equally versatile on either two- or four-stroke machines.

He quickly became a works Norton rider alongside Peter Williams and Phil Read, part of the first Norton factory team since the Norton race-shop was disbanded in 1962, headed by ex-racer Frank Perris. In 1972, he teamed with Dave Croxford to win the Thruxton 500 endurance race on a 745 cc Norton Commando, and finished second to Williams in the 1973 F750 TT.

In 1974, Grant was the chosen  rider for the then-new, UK-based Boyer Kawasaki Racing Team, based on two air-cooled triples. Stan Shenton, head of motorcycle business Boyer of Bromley, previously having a long background of racing Triumphs, was Team principal. They were one of a selected network of regional Kawasaki dealers, part of a controlled expansion and roll-out to establish a UK dealer-network. As part of the development process, Grant's racing included Ontario, California in late 1974.

In 1975, Grant completed the first-ever 120 mph lap of the North West 200 circuit. Also in 1975, it was Grant who finally broke Mike Hailwood's absolute TT lap record for the Isle of Man Snaefell mountain course, set in 1967 on a 500 Honda, raising the average-speed of one lap to 109.82 mph on a Kawasaki KR750 two-stroke triple entered by the Boyer team and Stan Shenton. Although Grant failed to finish the race, retiring at the Gooseneck with a broken chain caused by a mis-aligned rear wheel spindle, he won the 500 cc Senior TT race. In 1977, Grant raised the lap record to 112.77 mph, again on a 750 cc Kawasaki.

Grant raced in the Grand Prix motorcycle racing circuit in 1977 for the Kawasaki factory team alongside teammate Barry Ditchburn and the following year with Kork Ballington and Gregg Hansford. In 1979, Honda chose Grant to help develop their exotic oval-cylindered NR500, unfortunately with disappointing results. Grant also won the Macau Grand Prix in 1977 on the Kawasaki KR750 and again in 1984, riding a Heron-Suzuki.

He usually raced with number 10 and carried the initials JL on his helmet, even after retirement from competition, as a tribute to his early sponsor – mechanic, fabricator and frame-builder Jim Lee of the 'Dalesman' marque.<ref>Motor Cycle 19 August 1966, p.207 Orpin's latest flyer by David J Dixon. "The new frame, built specially for Peter Williams by ace welder Jim Lee of Leeds..." Accessed and added 26 December 2014</ref>

Grand Prix motorcycle racing results

Points system from 1969 onwards:

(key) (Races in bold indicate pole position; races in italics'' indicate fastest lap)

References 

1944 births
Living people
Sportspeople from Wakefield
People from Seamer, Scarborough
British motorcycle racers
English motorcycle racers
British Superbike Championship riders
Isle of Man TT riders
250cc World Championship riders
350cc World Championship riders
500cc World Championship riders
Place of birth missing (living people)